Andrew Lewis is the name of:

Andrew Lewis (boxer) (1970–2015), Guyanese boxer
Andrew Lewis (composer) (born 1963), British composer
Andrew Lewis (Pennsylvania politician), American politician in the Pennsylvania House of Representatives
Andrew Lewis (professor), professor emeritus of comparative legal history at University College London
Andrew Lewis (Royal Navy officer) (1918–1994), British admiral
Andrew Lewis (rugby union) (born 1973), former Welsh international rugby union player
Andrew Lewis (sailor) (born 1989), Trinidadian sailor
Andrew Lewis (soccer) (born 1974), American soccer player
Andrew Lewis (soldier) (1720–1781), American pioneer, surveyor, and soldier
Andrew J. Lewis (comics) (21st century), British comics writer
Andrew J. Lewis (politician) (born 1989), American politician on the Seattle City Council
Andrew L. Lewis Jr. (1931–2016), American railroad executive and Secretary of Transportation under Ronald Reagan
Andrew L. Lewis (admiral), US Navy admiral
Andrew W. Lewis (1943–2017), medieval and Renaissance Europe historian at Missouri State University
Sir Andrew Jopp Williams Lewis (1875-1952) Lord Provost of Aberdeen

See also
Andre Lewis (disambiguation)
Andrew Lewis High School, Salem, Virginia
Andy Lewis (disambiguation)